Parākramabāhu I (Sinhala: මහා පරාක්‍රමබාහු,  1123–1186), or Parakramabahu the Great, was the king of Polonnaruwa from 1153 to 1186. He oversaw the expansion and beautification of his capital, constructed extensive irrigation systems, reorganised the country's army, reformed Buddhist practices, encouraged the arts and undertook military campaigns in South India and Burma. The adage "Not even a drop of water that comes from the rain must flow into the ocean without being made useful to man" is one of his most famous utterances.

In 1140, Parakramabahu following the death of his uncle, Kitti Sri Megha, Prince of Dakkinadesa, ascended the throne of Dakkhinadesa. Over the next decade, improved both Dakkhinadesi infrastructure and military. Following a protracted civil war, he secured power over the entire island around 1153 and remained in this position until his death in 1186. During Parākramabāhu's reign, he launched a punitive campaign against the kings of Burma, aided the Pandyan dynasty against the Chola dynasty in southern India and maintained extensive trade relations with China, Angkor, and countries in the Middle East. Within the island, he consecrated religious monuments, built hospitals, social welfare units, canals and large reservoirs, such as the Sea of Parakrama.

Background

Early 

The island of Sri Lanka was disrupted by Cholas, following an invasion by Raja Raja Chola I, who took advantage from an internal strife and conquered nearly half of the island. It was not until his successor the island was almost under Chola control. These regions remained under Chola control until the reign of Vijayabahu I (1070–1100); when Vijayabahu I successfully drove the Chola invaders out of the island, he continued the capital at Polonnaruwa rather than Anuradhapura. By the reign of Vikramabāhu I (1111–1132), the island was divided into three kingdoms—Kingdom of Rajarata, Kingdom of Dakkhinadesa, and Kingdom of Ruhuna. Vijayabahu I had given his sister Mitta's hand in marriage to a Tamil Pandyan prince, and that Pandyan prince would go on to become the father of Manabharana, who in turn was the father of Parakramabahu I. Vikramabāhu was however regarded as the greatest in dignity as he possessed Rajarata with its sites of religious and historical importance. However, Manabharana, king of Dakkhinadesa ("South Country"), and his brothers Sri Vallabha and Kitti Sri Megha, the joint kings of Ruhuna, were formidable rivals for the crown. Furthermore all three were the descendants of Vijayabahu's sister, and thus had a strong claim to the throne; they are referred to in the Culavamsa as the Arya branch of the royal dynasty, whilst Vikramabāhu I is of the Kalinga branch.

Birth

At the time of Parakramabahu's birth, the governor of Dakkhinadesa, Manabharana, been the eldest of the Arya kings, had two daughters, Mitta and Phabavati (and no sons). He said:

On the other hand, his younger brother, Sri Vallabha and his wife Sugala, had two children, one of them being a son, challenged the party of Manabharana. As per this, he stepped down and passed his work to his ministers.

The chronicle states further as, Parākramabāhu's birth was predicted by a figure akin to a god seen in a dream by his father, King Manabharana of Dakkhinadesa. A son was duly born to Manabharana's wife Ratnavali, and was named Parakramabahu. Though the year of his birth cannot be known exactly confirmed, it is generally thought to be around 1123. The location would almost certainly have been the capital of Dakkhinadesa, Punkhagama.

Upon being informed of the child's birth, Vikramabāhu I in Polonnaruwa ordered that the boy be brought up as the heir to his throne. This kind of adoption may have been an olive branch of sorts on the part of Vikramabāhu, who wished to keep the throne until his death, after which it would be passed on to Parākramabāhu. Manabharana, however, rejected the offer, stating that "It is not (prudent) ... to send away such a jewel of a son". He also speculated that "...if the boy is taken thither, the party of Vikkamabahu... will gleam with mighty, up-shooting flames, but our misfortune, alas so great, will become still worse!"

Soon after the child's birth, Manabharana fell ill and died. His younger brother Kitti Sri Megha, who was joint king of Ruhuna, ascended the throne of Dakkhinadesa, while Sri Vallabha was declared sole king of Ruhuna. Parākramabāhu, his mother Ratnavali and his two sisters Mitta and Pabhavati, were sent to live in Mahanagahula, the capital of Ruhuna, under the care of Manabharana's brother Sri Vallabha.

Youth

In Ruhuna and Dakkhinadesa

Whilst he was still young, his eldest sister Mitta was forcibly married to their cousin, Manabharana, the son of Sri Vallabha of Ruhuna, against the wishes of Queen Ratnavali. Ratnavali was herself of the Kalinga clan of the royal family, and though she was the widow of a king of the Arya branch of the royal family, she preferred to see her daughters married to a king from the Kalinga clan. During his time at Sri Vallabha's court, Parākramabāhu met his future mahesi "queen consort", Lilavati, Sri Vallabha's daughter, who, went on to rule the country in her own right.

In 1132, following the death of Vikramabāhu, his son, Gajabahu II succeeded to the throne of Rajarata. Two monarchs of the Arya branch of the royal family, Sri Vallabha and Kitti Sri Megha, tried unsuccessfully to seize Rajarata by force.

On the other hand, Parākramabāhu, impatient having only a minor state to rule, left Sri Vallabha's palace in Ruhuna and returned to Dakkhinadesa, where he took up residence with his uncle. Impatience is also to be attributed to Sri Vallabha's plans to place Manabharana of Ruhuna on the throne of Rajarata, which made Parākramabāhu's position increasingly precarious in court. In Dakkhinadesa, on the other hand, he was well received by Kitti Sri Megha, who had no sons of his own, where he was essentially adopted.

In Rajarata
Some time after his coming of age, the young prince left Dakkhinadesa in secrecy and set out for Gajabahu II's realm in Rajarata. Having met his allies at Badalattha (modern Batalagoda), he visited the senapati Sankha, on the border between Rajarata and Dakkhinadesa. When Sankha tried to inform Kitti Sri Megha of the prince's journey, Parākramabāhu had him killed. Parākramabāhu then seized Buddhagama (modern Menikdena Nuwara) and all of Sankha's property. He continued his journey, having evaded a force sent against him by Kitti Sri Megha, who feared complications with the court of Polonnaruwa, and traveled through the Malaya region to Gajabahu's court.

The reason provided for Kitti Sri Megha's efforts to bring the prince back to Dakkhinadesa are presented as nothing more than concern for the well being of his nephew as well as concerns that Parākramabāhu may reignite hostilities between the Arya and Kalinga factions. However, that the king of Dakkhinadesa was "tenderly attached" to his nephew is regarded as "fiction", and it is pointed out that "the spirit in which the accounts of these conflicts are conceived is irreconcilable with the theory of untroubled relations between uncle and nephew."

During his time in Gajabahu's court, the Parākramabāhu did two things of significance. The first was to enmesh the court of Gajabahu in a web of espionage and the other was to marry one of his sisters called Bhaddavati, to King Gajabahu. Through this marriage, Parākramabāhu managed matters that Gajabahu II completely trusted him, as much as he did the royal family. Nevertheless, he retained the entirety of Bhaddavati's dowry for himself. The second was secretly negotiating with Gajabahu's general, Gokanna. However, Gajabahu eventually grew suspicious of Parākramabāhu's activities, and aware, Parākramabāhu departed Rajarata in secrecy by night and returned to Dakkhinadesa.

Return to Dakkhinadesa

In Dakkhinadesa,  Parākramabāhu was reluctant to enter the capital Sankhatthali to see his uncle, King Kitti Sri Megha, until persuaded by his mother Ratnavali to do so. Kitti Sri Megha however died soon after Parākramabāhu's return and the Culavamsa notes that the prince "was not mastered by the agitation called forth by the grief at his father's (sic) death"—perhaps a sign of lingering ill feeling between the two. Parākramabāhu was now king of Dakkhinadesa.

King of Dakkhinadesa

Government and construction

Parakramabahu was the sole king of Dakkhinadesa by  1140; his objective for Dakkhinadesa was to expand it so that it would surpass the greatness of other two kingdoms, in a short period of time. He formed an administration center called Parakramapura, solely for him. The capital of Parakramapura is identified with modern city Panduwas Nuwara.

Afterwards, he started a huge program of construction and renovation of shrines and other structures, the remnants of which can still be seen in North Central Province, Sri Lanka, today. It is mentioned of him as having restored an ancient causeway called the Kotabaddha, over the Deduru Oya (Deduru Lake) near modern Kurunegala. The new king's personality was illustrated when the architects commissioned to the project informed him that it was well-nigh impossible to carry out, to which Parākramabāhu replied that "What is there in the world that cannot be carried out by people of energy?". He ordered the construction of canals and dams, and cleared a large area of forest around them for new fields. Most notably, he constructed the Parakrama Samudra, a giant reservoir from which a large swathe of territory derived its water supply. On islands in the middle of the reservoir he constructed a palace and a stupa.

Trade from Dakkhinadesa
Trade was an important component of Dakkhinadesa's income since the island of Sri Lanka, given its geographical position, had always been at the junction of several major trade routes. Chinese silk was a significant import and was used in the consecration of statues and shrines. Pearls and gems (of which the king took particular interest) constituted an important part of the island's exports, as did cinnamon (which remained, until the 19th century, Sri Lanka's major export), and war elephants.  Most trade was carried out through the main seaports of the principality, Kalpitiya, Halaavatha (Chilaw) and Colombo.

Preparation for war
Parakramabahu decided to expand the region by entering the war, which spanned for over a decade. He first decided to reorganize the guards of Dakkhinadesa kingdom. 

Parākramabāhu's army had a diverse ethnic make-up. Some of his officers were from the two grand old clans of Sri Lanka, the Moriya and the Lambakanna, who had between them dominated Rajarata from Anuradhapura. Under a man styling himself the king of Malaya (modern Dumbara). By the time hostilities broke out between Dakkhinadesa and Rajarata, the former's forces also included Veddas, Vellalar, and people from the lower castes not traditionally involved in martial activities. The Culavamsa places the number of soldiers at somewhere around 100,000 people but the real figure was probably lower.  Parākramabāhu would have been able to field war elephants, cavalry, and siege engines, and his force represented a serious threat to Gajabahu's power in the north.

Conquest of Rajarata

War with Gajabahu
Around 1150, Parākramabāhu made his first move by seizing control of Malaya, strategically securing his eastern flank. He then moved his forces against various chieftains on the border of Rajarata. The final stage of this early campaign was the defeat of an army of Gajabahu himself, after which there was a brief ceasefire between the two sides.

Hostilities resumed soon afterwards. Gajabahu had resorted to securing support from abroad, and by the time hostilities resumed between him and Parākramabāhu, the army of Rajarata included nobles of heretical faith from abroad. Parākramabāhu himself did not participate in the invasion of Rajarata, but was responsible for the overall strategy of the campaign, which was based on the writings of Kautilya.

The forces of Dakkhinadesa struck at the fortress of Mallavalana near the mouth of the Kala Oya, seizing it and occupying the western coast of Sri Lanka. The army then sailed up to the north and landed at a place called Muttakara or Mutukara ('Pearl-mine') near modern Mannar, Sri Lanka. In the meantime, Gajabahu's senior general Gokanna suffered several defeats in the vicinity of Kala Vewa and was forced to appeal to Gajabahu in order to receive reinforcements. Despite receiving these and meeting with some success in Malaya, Gokanna was again defeated by Parākramabāhu's general Mahinda, a rout so total that Gokanna fled the battle scene leaving behind his umbrella, an important status symbol in medieval Sri Lanka. The remnants of his force constructed a fortress in a jungle and took no further part in the war. The retreating forces used horses with carriages to escape into the jungle, with supplies in carriages.

Dakkhinadesi troops advanced through the Amban river and advanced into Bogambara. Afterwards, defeated the heavily reinforced army and bodyguards of Gajabahu, and captured Rajarata. Gajabahu was locked in the palace. Parakramabahu ordered the troops of the Dakkhinadesa army to treat Gajabahu with respect and not to pillage Rajarata.

Despite this, some members of Dakkhinadesi army are known to have disregarded his commands by breaking open house doors in Rajarata, and plundering goods and stole raiment and ornaments from the people of the city. This pillaging was to have dire consequences for Parākramabāhu. Angered by the actions of the forces of Dakkhinadesa, Gajabahu appealed to Manabharana of Ruhuna, who was at Sorabara, in the center of the country, for assistance.

War with Manabharana 
Parākramabāhu sent his senapathi Deva to restore order to Polonnaruwa, but he found himself in battle with Manabharana of Ruhuna before he could reorganize his troops. The king of Ruhuna kept to his word and delivered Parākramabāhu's forces a crushing blow, driving them from Polonnaruwa. For the Kalinga clan however, the alliance with Manabharana of the Arya clan, backfired and it was soon made clear to Gajabahu that Manabharana intended to keep the city for himself. He put to death many of Gajabahu's senior officials, and imprisoned Gajabahu, letting him starve to death.  

Gajabahu then appealed to Parākramabāhu for assistance by secretly sending a message, and Parākramabāhu ordered his troops to cut off grain supplies by roaming around the towns of Manabharana of Ruhuna; the troops blockaded the roads between Ruhuna and Polonnaruwa. As a result, all the people in the town with Manabharana became "weakened birds in a cage". With the sporadic attacks from Dakkhinadesa forces slowly grinding down his power in the north, Manabharana left Polonnaruwa to attack a force commanded by Rakkha that had been wreaking havoc in western Rajarata. In his absence Parākramabāhu's forces seized Polonnaruwa, liberated Gajabahu II, and took into their possession the entirety of the treasure of Manabharana of Ruhuna. The king of Ruhuna returned to his capital with the sacred relics, the tooth relic and the alms bowls.

Gajabahu, who had been set free by Parakramabahu, left Polonnaruwa before Parākramabāhu arrived and decided to leave the country by ship. However, an attack by some of Gajabahu's followers on Parākramabāhu's troops reignited hostilities between the two, and Parākramabāhu had to send his army to capture Gajabahu. By late 1153, after suffering a number of defeats, Gajabahu realized his capture was imminent, and appealed to the Sangha to intervene.  They persuaded Parākramabāhu that the ailing king no longer posed a threat, and that he should be allowed to live out the rest of his days in peace. Manabharana tried to woo the king back to the battle against Parākramabāhu, but Gajabahu refused, having the words "I have made over Rajarata to Parākramabāhu" inscribed on a stone tablet (Sangamuwa Inscription)  to confirm his abdication in favor of Parākramabāhu. Gajabahu moved to Gantale (Kantalai), where he died in the 22nd year after his coronation as king of Rajarata.

Coronation and defeat of Manabharana

Parākramabāhu was immediately crowned king of Rajarata, but the war was far from over. Manabharana struck again, sending his armies to the Mahaweli River and attempting to cross into Rajarata via two fords. In the meantime, Narayana, a chieftain based at Anuradhapura, rose in rebellion, and Parākramabāhu's hold in the north was again threatened.

On this occasion Parākramabāhu decided to vanquish Manabharana once and for all; "Not even in Rohana will I permit King Manabharana who is here crushed in war, to find a hold". Rakkha was commanded to hold the fords at the Mahaweli while Parākramabāhu himself attacked from Dakkhinadesa into Ruhuna. Narayan's rebellion was suppressed by another force, leaving Rakkha, who had successfully held the fords at the Mahaweli River, free to invade from the north. Manabharana, supported by some loyalist inhabitants, defeated Dakkhinadesan army and drove them back to Rajarata. Parākramabāhu found himself facing dissension within his own ranks and the defeat of his forces in Malaya; Manabharana even recaptured Polonnaruwa and advanced into Giritale. Despite this Parākramabāhu persevered with the offensive, withdrawing from his southern campaign and concentrating his forces in the north. Manabharana once again found himself besieged in Polonnaruwa. Both sides were exhausted by the incessant warfare of the preceding years, and Manabharana eventually fled the city for Ruhuna. His forces were overtaken at the Mahaweli River by Parākramabāhu's army and annihilated; the king returned to the south in time to pass away from a combination of disease and exhaustion.

Parākramabāhu was finally the unquestioned lord of the entire island of Sri Lanka, even though it had been at the cost of around five years of incessant warfare. In years to come the king himself was to regard this war as one of the most significant events of his reign, mentioning it in several of his edicts carved on stone, such as the one near Devangala. He celebrated by summoning Manabharana's son to Polonnaruwa and concluding a peace with him, followed by a lavish coronation ceremony.

Reign
Parākramabāhu established himself at Polonnaruwa (Pulatthinagara as mentioned in the Chulavamsa) from 1153 onwards and ruled over the entirety of Sri Lanka for the next 33 years. During this time he undertook much of the work he is best remembered for, most significantly in the areas of religious reform, construction, and war.

Economic policies and trade
Shipwrecks were common on the area. Goods from ships were halved as long they didn't carry horses or elephants. Parākramabāhu's economic theory was largely based on the teachings of Kautilya, these could be an equivalent of what's known as state capitalism. As such, all trade, including Alcohol, were carried by the government. This not just helped control the drunkness of the citizens but also helped to limit alcohol to those of good quality. There was also a taxation.

Religious reform

During the reign of king Vatta Gamini Abhaya (104 BCE, 88–76 BCE), the sangha of the country had divided into three rival orders—the orders of the Mahavihara, Abhayagiri vihāra and Dakkhina vihara. One of Parākramabāhu's ambitions was the reunification of these groups into one order, as had existed at the time of Dutugamunu. Furthermore, much of the sangha had become corrupted over the years, with bhikkhus marrying and having children, and in many cases behaving much like upāsakas in their pursuit of worldly gain.

In  1165, a Theravada council was called in Polonnaruwa to discuss the reform of the sangha. Parākramabāhu's chief agent in the enterprise was to be the Mahathera Kassapa, an experienced monk who "knew the Tipiṭaka and was exceedingly well versed in the Vinaya". There was immense resistance to Parākramabāhu's efforts, in particular from the Abhayagiri sect who now adhered to the Vetullavada tradition, who the king found to be particularly corrupt. Many monks moved abroad rather than participate in the reforms, whilst some others simply abandoned the cloth and returned to lay life. In this they may well have been encouraged by Parākramabāhu, who seems to have felt that the "purification" of the priestly orders depended as much on the expulsion and exclusion of the corrupt as it did on the rewarding and encouragement of the orthodox.  Finally, the king summoned the leaders of the sangha on the island once a year, centering the visit on a ritual on the banks of the Mahaweli river—possibly a practical means of keeping up-to-date with their progress and their standards.

Following the crushing of rebellions in Ruhuna, in 1157, Parākramabāhu recovered the Tooth relic and the alms bowls from Ruhuna and brought them to Polonnaruwa; afterwards placed the relics in a shrine known as the Temple of the Tooth Relic in Polonnaruwa. Such constructions became a hallmark of Parākramabāhu's reign; his buildings for the reformed sangha are described in great detail in the Culavamsa and are often accompanied with inscriptions stating his intentions and accomplishments, such as at the Gal Vihara. A large revival of Hinayana is recorded during the time of Parakramabahu.

Construction

Parākramabāhu's constructions work made up a significant chunk of the material history of Sri Lanka. Much of the remnants of Polonnaruwa date from his reign, as well as sites in western and south-eastern Sri Lanka. One of Parākramabāhu's first projects was the restoration of Anuradhapura, including the restoration of Thuparamaya (which had been lost to the jungle), Mihintale, and Ruwanwelisaya. Parakramabahu, having abolished his office at Parakramapura of Dakkhinadesa, turned his attention on Polonnaruwa. Unsurprisingly, due to the near-yearly sieges, the city had suffered and had reached a state that nothing but its name remained. It is perhaps because of this that so little of pre-12th century Polonnaruwa remains until today.

It is said that the city was initially divided into four districts, each marked with its own alms-giving house for the clergy, containing "vessels of bronze, cushions and pillows, mats, carpets and bedsteads". He ordered the construction of hospitals, which he visited on several occasions. He also expanded Polonnaruwa's defensive walls, constructing an elaborate three-walled complex featuring turrets for archers and fourteen gates. None of which has survived till modern times. Beyond the city precinct it is believed he constructed or renovated three smaller townships, in addition to Parakramapura - Rajavesi Bhujanga, Raja Kulantaka (Sinhapura), and Vijitapura. Extensive gardens were also laid down around Polonnaruwa, featuring ponds and bathing-pools, one of which, the Twin Pools, survives till this date. One such garden, the 'Island Garden', extended into the middle of Thupa Vewa  ('Vewa' meaning 'tank' or 'reservoir' in Sinhala) on a promontory.

Much else survives, such as the Gal Vihare, or "Stone Shrine", near Polonnaruwa. The Culavamsa attributes the monument in its entirety to Parākramabāhu, though in truth his contribution may have been extensive refurbishment. The 
Polonnaruwa Vatedage, considered the peak construction out of all Vatadage temples ("Circular Shrine"), was constructed around 1157, likely to store the tooth relic. The Lankatilaka Temple, Alahena Pirivena, Jetavanaramaya and the Demala Maha Cetiya were also constructed in his reign. At the center of Polonnaruwa Parākramabāhu expanded and beatified the royal palace, with audience halls and bathing ponds. Little of it remains today, but its soaring walls hint at the grand scale of the king's vision.

Parākramabāhu also continued his program of hydraulic works begun in Dakkhinadesa, including the renovation and reconstruction of reservoirs and canals wrecked during the Chola invasion. He built the Parakrama Samudra which is 2,400 hectares (5,928 acres) of water. Inscriptions detailing his work can be found at the Maha Vewa near Uruwela, Padaviya Vewa and Panda Vewa in North-Western Province. A column discovered at the bottom of the Padaviya Vewa in the 19th century included the inscription "Made for the benefit of the whole world by the prosperous Sri Parakrama-Bahu, born at Sinhapura, minded of what was fit to be done". Though the Culavamsa attributes the construction of various tanks to him, it has been suggested that much of Parākramabāhu's work was renovation, and indeed that some of the projects undertaken by his successor, Nissanka Malla of Polonnaruwa, may have been attributed to him. In the Culawamsa, Parākramabāhu is said to have restored or constructed over 165 large tanks, in addition he renovated 2376 minor tanks and 3910 canals and 163 dams.

Despite their magnificence, Parākramabāhu's works exacted a heavy toll on the populace and the treasury. For much of the work in Anuradhapura he utilized Tamil prisoners of war seized during the Pandyan War, the POWs were revengefully sent to repair those destroyed during the Chola invasion. Nevertheless taxation and rajakariya (a feudal system in which work was owed to the king by commoners) contributed in large part to the projects. An interesting indicator of the burden of taxation is the disappearance of larger gold coins towards the end of Parākramabāhu's reign.

Military campaigns
Parākramabāhu's reign is memorable for two major campaigns—in the south of India as part of a Pandyan war of succession, and a punitive strike against the kings of Ramañña (Lower Burma) for various perceived insults to Sri Lanka. He also had to suppress wars against him in Ruhuna on several occasions.

Revolts
In 1156, Queen Sugala of Ruhuna, the mother of Manabharana of Ruhuna who had fought Parākramabāhu bitterly for the throne, joined a revolt against Parākramabāhu. The situation turned dire when a group of mercenaries took the opportunity afforded by the absence of Parākramabāhu's army, and his most formidable general Rakkha, to revolt in 1157. The revolt was organized by the army of Ruhuna.

Parākramabāhu dispatched another general, Bhuta, to assist Rakkha, who had become bogged down in conflict in Ruhuna. Despite reinforcements, Rakkha still appear to have become stuck in a war of attrition not unlike Parākramabāhu's wars for the throne. Certainly it outlasted a simultaneous rebellion in the north, which after three months of fighting ended after an engagement in the vicinity of Dik Vewa. The only major victory of this early phase of the rebellion in Ruhuna was the seizure of the Sacred Relics in late 1157.

One of former enemies of Parakramabahu, a general named Sukarabhatudev, who was a POW, escaped and went to Badulla, where he commanded forces against the armies of Parākramabāhu. During the war, Rakkha fell ill and died subsequently.

The tide finally turned when reinforcements arrived in Ruhuna, probably in early 1158, through Sabaragamuwa, and from the western coast. Mahagama was seized and Queen Sugala captured. The forces of Parākramabāhu then inflicted mass killings on the nobility and citizens of Ruhuna, seemingly accepted by Parākramabāhu. "They caused many foes to whom severity was due, to be brought before them, and at villages and market-towns they had numbers of stakes set up on which they impaled many hundreds of the enemy. Many other foes they had hanged on the gallows and burnt and showed forth in every way the majesty of Parākramabāhu". It may well have been the case that the king was tired of the constant animosity directed at him by the kingdom. The brutal suppression of the rebellion ensured that, apart from a brief insurrection in 1160, Ruhuna remained quiet for the rest of his reign. The fate of Queen Sugala is not recorded.

The only other rebellion of Parākramabāhu's reign occurred in the region of modern Mantota in from 1168–1169.

War with Bagan

The city-state of Bagan (modern Burma), and Sri Lanka had enjoyed a cordial relationship based on trade and a common faith (Theravada Buddhism) for a long time. Bagan emerged as a power in the 9th century and by the 11th century its capital city, Arimaddhanapura, was a centre of Buddhist learning. Bagan was also a long-time opponent of the Chola dynasty.

However with the accession of Narathu (1167–1171), to the throne, and the hostilities between the Angkor and Burma, the situation changed dramatically. Initially he deprived the envoys of the King of Sri Lanka the maintenance they were previously granted. He also issued an order prohibiting the sale of elephants to foreign countries and did away with the age old custom of presenting an elephant to every foreign vessel which brought him gifts. He later had the Sri Lankan envoys imprisoned and tortured, and had all their possessions, including their money, their elephants and their vessels confiscated. He perceived insults to the Sri Lankan ambassador to Burma and later summoned them and declared,

Whatever the reason, Parākramabāhu was incensed. After preparing a navy at Pallavavanka, he dispatched to Bagan a formidable naval force. The size of the army is not known, but it is recorded as containing a year's supply of grains, specially modified arrows, and Sri Lanka's fearsome war elephants. Despite setbacks en route, including the sinking of one ship and the loss of a few others, the army arrived at the city of Kusumiya (modern Pathein) on the banks of the Bago river, and captured it. Thereafter, the armies are said to have captured several other cities, including Arimaddhanapura, assassinated Narathu, and restored relations between the two countries to normal.

The account of the campaign in Bagan is possibly exaggerated, particularly as Burmese chronicles do not contain any information on a massive invasion from Lanka. Nevertheless there is evidence to indicate that there was some form of campaign undertaken, and that it was a successful one. The story of a Sri Lankan invasion that dethroned Narathu is known in Myanmar. Furthermore, a contemporary inscription at Devanagala mentions the awarding of land to the general Kitti Nagaragiri for his leadership in a campaign to 'Ramanna', naming the king of Bagan as 'Bhuvanaditta', a possible Sinhalization of 'Narathu'.

George Coedes states Parakramabahu I launched the retaliatory raid in 1180 (even after the Pandyan war), after Narapatisithu (son of Narathu) imprisoned Sinhalese envoys, tradesmen, and a princess on her way to the Khmer country; whatever the timeline is, the hostility from Narathu may have been largely caused by Narathu's hatred towards the Khmers.

Pandya War, 1167–1183

In 1167 the Pandyan king Parakrama appealed to his namesake in Sri Lanka for assistance against an alliance of his rival Kulasekhara Pandya and the Cholas. Such an appeal was not unusual, as the Pandya had long found allies in the Sinhalese monarchs, specially wars against the Cholas, and their nobility had spent some time in exile at the court of Mahinda IV (956–972) after the invasion of their land by Parantaka Chola II.

On this occasion however the Sri Lankan help came too late. By the time Parākramabāhu's general Lankapura Dandanatha arrived in Pandya Nadu, Kulasekhara had captured the capital city of Madurai and killed Parakrama's wife and children. His son Prince Virapandu however had managed to escape. Rather than head for Madurai, Lankapura landed in the vicinity of Ramanathapuram and captured the city of Rameswaram, which remained in Sri Lankan hands for the next thirty years or so.  Here they built a fortress called Parakramapura. In this early phase of the war they fought Kulasekhara on several occasions, eventually laying siege to him in Madurai and seizing the city. Virapandu was restored to power, but apparently only as a puppet, as the army under Lankapura's leadership remained in Madurai, and continued to engage the Chola across south India, eventually raiding the Chola territory and striking fear into its feaudatories.

The Sinhalese invasion was so successful that Lankapura appears to have established a near-permanent authority over Pandya Nadu (the chapter is entitled Conquest of the Pandya Kingdom), even establishing a fortress called Panduvijaya in commemoration of the conquest.

Death and legacy

Succession
The Culavamsa states only that Parākramabāhu "carried on rule for thirty-three years", and that he died in Polonnaruwa. He was succeeded by Vijayabahu II of Polonnaruwa, described as his "sister's son", who he had summoned from Sinhapura, capital of Kalinga. His place of burial is unknown. Vijayabahu II brought back the friendly relations between Polonnaruwa and Rāmmana, who Parākramabāhu fought against during his reign.

Despite his personal reputation and authority, it is noted by historians such as H.W Corrington and Wilhelm Geiger, that Parākramabāhu did not take any steps towards ensuring a smooth succession. One reason offered is the strength of Sri Lankan conventional law, which contained fairly fluid conventions for the replacement of rulers. Excluding Nissanka Malla, all the successors of him appears to have been weak. The chronic instability and the renewal of the civil war of the years following the end his reign undid many of his constructions.

Furthermore, Polonnaruwa was lost to jungle, only to be discovered by the Department of Archeology of Ceylon in 1903. Harry Charles Purvis Bell in 1903 noted that it was mostly destroyed.

Legacy and issues
During his reign, Sinhalese power contributed to the destabilizing of the Chola dynasty of south India; and Sinhalese forces continued to have a presence in Rameswaram till the end of the 12th century, or so. There are also records of Sinhala victories until well into the reign of King Nissanka Malla (1187–1196). 

Furthermore the sheer size and extent of the king's construction projects can still be seen in Polonnaruwa today, as well as in the various carvings dotted around the country vaunting the accomplishments of the "Great King". However such success came at a price. Relentless warfare took its toll on the country and taxation was high under his reign and high-value coinage all but disappeared towards the end of his rule, a sign of increasing poverty.

His other weakness was the lack of restraint in his spending, taking Sri Lanka to greater heights that it had reached in a long time, but exhausting the island's resources in the process.

Name
The popularity of Parākramabāhu is attested by the fact that no less than seven monarchs adopted his name over the next four centuries, of whom only two or three could lay claim to even a fraction of his successes. The Sri Lankan Navy has two ships named after Parakramabahu.

See also
 Mahavamsa
 List of monarchs of Sri Lanka
 History of Sri Lanka
 Architecture of ancient Sri Lanka

Notes

References

Further reading
Mitton, G.E., The Lost Cities of Ceylon, J.Murray, London 1916
Perera, L.H.H., Additional chapters to H.W. Codrington's A short history of Ceylon, Macmillan, London 1952.

External links

An extensive online resource on Sri Lankan history, containing the Mahavamsa, Culavamsa, and numerous historical works.
A site on the now-lost cities of Ruhuna.
A site about the Bagan Kingdom.
The Culavamsa: Being the More Recent Part of the Mahavamsa, W. Geiger

Monarchs of Polonnaruwa
P
1123 births
1186 deaths
P
P
Military history of Sri Lanka
Kingdom of Polonnaruwa
Polonnaruwa
Sinhalese monarchy
Sinhalese Buddhist monarchs
Sri Lankan Buddhists